Li Jiahang (born March 8, 1987) is a Chinese actor.

Life and career
Li Jiahang was born in Anshan, Liaoning. He graduated from Shanghai Theatre Academy in 2010. In New My Fair Princess, he played the role of Fu Erkang. He then starred in the sitcom iPartment playing the role of a young and unfortunate lawyer.

Filmography

Film

Television series

References

External links
  Li Jiahang on Sina Weibo
  Li Jiahang's blog on Sina.com
 

Living people
Male actors from Liaoning
People from Anshan
Shanghai Theatre Academy alumni
1987 births
Chinese male film actors
Chinese male television actors
21st-century Chinese male actors